Punchi Andare (Little Andare), is a 2018 Sri Lankan Sinhala children's comedy film directed by veteran director Sumith Rohana Thiththawelgala and produced by Rajitha Swaris. The film stars child actor Praveen Katukithule with Mahendra Perera, Sathischandra Edirisinghe in lead roles along with W. Jayasiri and Maurine Charuni. The music is composed by Rohana Weerasinghe. It is the 1303th Sri Lankan film in the Sinhala cinema.

Plot

Cast
 Praveen Katukithule as Andare
 Mahendra Perera as Andare's father
 Sathischandra Edirisinghe as Andare's grand father 
 W. Jayasiri 
 Maureen Charuni as Andare's mother
 Poshini Dissanayake as Andare's sister
 Yohani Hansika as Andare's cousin sister
 Manel Chandralatha 
 Suneetha Wimalaweera
 Udeni Alwis
 Kumara Siriwardana as Dankotuwa Rala 
 Berty Susiripala
 Mapalagama Wimalarathna

References

External links
 

2018 films
2010s Sinhala-language films